The Port Washington Water District is a public water utility district in Nassau County, on Long Island, in New York, United States.

Description 
The Port Washington Water District was established in 1913. As of 2019, the district serves over 30,000 residents throughout the Greater Port Washington area.

Communities served 
The Port Washington Water District serves the following communities:

 Baxter Estates
 Flower Hill (part, with the Manhasset–Lakeville Water District and the Roslyn Water District)
 Manorhaven
 Plandome Manor (part, with the Manhasset–Lakeville Water District)
 Port Washington (part, with Port Washington Water District)
 Port Washington North

References

External links 

 Official website
 Water supply infrastructure in the United States